Pirkko Korkee (born 25 March 1927) is a Finnish former cross-country skier who competed in the 1950s. She earned a silver medal in the 3 × 5 km relay at the 1958 FIS Nordic World Ski Championships in Lahti.

Cross-country skiing results

World Championships
 1 medal – (1 silver)

External links
World Championship results 

Finnish female cross-country skiers
Possibly living people
1927 births
FIS Nordic World Ski Championships medalists in cross-country skiing
20th-century Finnish women